Edward Eliscu (April 2, 1902 – June 18, 1998) was an American lyricist, playwright, producer and actor, and a successful writer of songs for films.

Life 
Eliscu was born in Manhattan, New York City. He attended DeWitt Clinton High School in Manhattan as a classmate of director George Cukor. He then attended City College of New York and graduated with a Bachelor of Science degree.

He then began acting in Broadway plays. Eliscu's first film score was with Vincent Youmans and Billy Rose for the film Great Day.  Two well-known songs from that show include "More Than You Know," and "Without a Song."

He married the dancer and journalist Stella Bloch in 1931. They both worked in the film industry until the House Committee on Un-American Activities named her husband in the 1950s. This ended his career in the film and later in the television industry. Eliscu together with his wife's cousin Mortimer Offner moved away from Hollywood and returned to New York.

Elscu was inducted into the Songwriters Hall of Fame in 1975.

He died on June 18, 1998, aged 96, in Newtown, Connecticut.

Eliscu is the grandfather of music journalist and broadcaster Jenny Eliscu.

Works

Selected film and theatre scores 

 Lady Fingers
 The Street Singer
 A Little Racketeer
 Frederica (also librettist)
 Meet the People (also producer)
 The Banker's Daughter
 9:15 Revue
 The Garrick Gaieties (1930)
 The Little Show
 Flying Down to Rio (1933)
 The Gay Senorita (1945)

Selected hits 
"Happy Because I'm in Love"
"Ankle Up the Altar"
"Music Makes Me"
"Orchids in the Moonlight"
"Meet the People"
"A Fellow and a Girl"
"You Forgot Your Gloves"
"Without a Song"
"More Than You Know"

Selected collaborators 
Vincent Youmans
Billy Rose
Jay Gorney
Henry Myers (composer)
John Green
Gus Kahn
Vernon Duke
Manning Sherwin
Richard Myers
Ned Lehac
Billy Hill

References

External links 

1902 births
1998 deaths
Songwriters from New York (state)
American male stage actors
20th-century American male actors
20th-century American dramatists and playwrights
American male dramatists and playwrights
20th-century American singers
DeWitt Clinton High School alumni
City College of New York alumni
20th-century American male writers
American people of Romanian descent